The Sword Battalion, formerly Unit 300 and also known as the IDF Minorities Unit, was an Arabic-speaking battalion of the Israel Defense Forces.

History
Unit 300 was formed in the early summer of 1948 by incorporating Druze defectors from the Arab Liberation Army and small numbers of Bedouins and Circassians. The battalion was attached to the Oded Brigade and took part in Israel's Operation Hiram in October 1948; it fought in every major Arab–Israeli war since. While ethnic Druze comprised the majority of the its members, there were also recruits drawn from the Bedouin, Circassian, Christian and Arab Muslim communities. The battalion produced several generals for the Israel Defense Forces (IDF).

The Sword Battalion had a small elite Sayeret wing.

The Druze and Circassian communities are the only ethnic groups in Israel who are subject to mandatory conscription alongside the Jewish majority; however, unlike the conscription system in place for Israeli Jews, which draws both males and females, only males are drafted from the Druze and Circassian minority communities. The conscription of Druze Israelis began shortly after the passing of the State Defense Act of 1949, which called for mandatory military service by all individuals in the country; non-Jews were exempted from this act by the Israeli government. The Druze leadership appealed to Israeli prime minister David Ben-Gurion in the mid-1950s to cancel the Druze exemption and draft Druze men into the Israeli military on the same basis as Jewish men. Originally, they served in the framework of a special unit. Since the 1980s, Druze soldiers have increasingly joined regular combat units of the IDF, and have attained high ranks and commendations for distinguished service. The service-continuation rate of Druze Israeli males stood at 83 percent in 2009. According to IDF statistics, 369 Druze soldiers have been killed in Israeli combat operations since 1948.

There is a long-standing Israeli government policy of encouraging Bedouins to volunteer and offering them various incentives. In some Bedouin communities, a military career is seen as a means of social mobility in Israel. Christian and Muslim Arabs are also accepted as volunteers.

In 1987, Unit 300 was officially renamed to the Sword Battalion.

In May 2015, the IDF revealed its plan to disband the Sword Battalion, after research revealed the vast majority of its recruits would rather integrate into the rest of the military.

Gallery

See also
 Druze
Israeli Druze
 Circassians
Israeli Circassians
Bedouins
Negev Bedouins in Israel
Israeli Christians

References

Further reading
Parsons, Laila (2001). The Druze and the birth of Israel. In Eugene L. Rogan and Avi Shalim (Eds.). The War for Palestine (pp. 60–78). Cambridge: Cambridge University Press. 
Zeedan, Rami (2015). Battalion of Arab- The History of the Minorities' Unit in the IDF from 1948 to 1956. Ben Shemen, Israel: Modan Publishing, in cooperation with Maarachot. (Hebrew).
Zeedan, Rami. "The Role of Military Service in the Integration/Segregation of Muslims, Christians and Druze within Israel." Societies 9, no. 1 (2019): 1. 

1948 Arab–Israeli War
Military units and formations of Israel
Military units and formations established in 1948
Battalions of Israel
Military units and formations disestablished in 2015